Raed Al-Amri (born June 27, 1989), is a Saudi Arabian professional footballer who plays as a left-back.

References

External links 
 

Living people
1989 births
Saudi Arabian footballers
Najran SC players
Al-Watani Club players
Ittihad FC players
Al-Raed FC players
Al-Kawkab FC players
Al-Tai FC players
Al-Shoulla FC players
Al-Sahel SC (Saudi Arabia) players
Saudi First Division League players
Saudi Professional League players
Saudi Second Division players
Association football fullbacks